The Government of Namibia allows citizens of specific countries and territories to travel to Namibia for tourism, visiting friends and relatives as well as official purposes for three months with an ordinary, diplomatic and service passports without having to obtain a visa. All visitors must hold a passport valid for 6 months.

Namibia will soon start issuing African passport holders with visas on arrival at ports of entry as a first step towards the eventual abolition of all visa requirements for all Africans.

Namibia is expected to become part of the universal KAZA visa.

Visa policy map

Visa exemption
Holders of ordinary passports issued by the following 55 jurisdictions can enter Namibia without a visa for a maximum stay of 3 months within one calendar year (90 days within any 180 day period for Russia):

1 - including holders of MSAR passports and MSAR Travel Permits.
2 - including all classes of British nationality.

Holders of diplomatic, official or service passports issued to nationals of Ghana, Congo, India, Nigeria, Poland, Rwanda, Turkey and Venezuela do not require a visa to enter Namibia.

African holders of diplomatic or official passports are exempted from Namibian visas.

Visa on arrival
Citizens of the following 42(+5) countries and territories can obtain a visa on arrival arriving at Hosea Kutako International Airport or Walvis Bay Airport for a maximum stay of 3 months.
The cost of the visa on arrival is N$1200.

1 - These countries are included in the Visa exemption.

In the future, visas will be issued on arrival at border crossings in Ariamsvlei, Noordoewer, Oranjemund, Trans-Kalahari, Katima Mulilo and Oshikango.

Visitor statistics
Most visitors arriving to Namibia were from the following countries of nationality:

See also

Visa requirements for Namibian citizens

References

Namibia
Visa Policy